María Magdalena is a 1954 Argentine drama film. Directed by Carlos Hugo Christensen, it stars Laura Hidalgo in the title role. It was Christensen's last film before he continued filming in Brazil.

Plot
María, a passionate and selfish woman, willingly maintains an affair with Rómulo, a married man who ends up abandoning his fragile and insecure wife to unleash all his passions with her. Being wealthy and gorgeous Maria also displays cynicism, pride and unscrupulousness which causes torture and suffering of those around her. Then came David, a dedicated scientist who attends to the unprotected and sacrificed workers of Maria's plantation, which showed the latter the ghosts of her licentious life.

Cast
Laura Hidalgo as Maria Magdalena Da Silva
Francisco Martínez Allende as Prof. David Guimaraes

References

External links
 

1954 films
1950s Spanish-language films
Argentine black-and-white films
Films directed by Carlos Hugo Christensen
Argentine drama films
1954 drama films
1950s Argentine films

br:María Magdalena